The 1940 Cork Intermediate Hurling Championship was the 31st staging of the Cork Intermediate Hurling Championship since its establishment by the Cork County Board in 1909.

Buttevant won the championship following a 2-04 to 1-04 defeat of Ballincollig in the final. This was their first ever championship title.

Results

Final

References

Cork Intermediate Hurling Championship
Cork Intermediate Hurling Championship